Radiation Protection Convention, 1960 is  an International Labour Organization Convention to restrict workers from exposure of ionising radiation and to prohibit persons under 16 engaging in work that causes such exposure. (Article 6)

It was established in 1960, with the preamble stating:
Having decided upon the adoption of certain proposals with regard to the protection of workers against ionising radiations,...

Article 2. This Convention applies to all activities involving exposure of workers to ionising radiation in the course of their work.

Article 5. Every effort shall be made to restrict the exposure of workers to ionising radiation to the lowest protectable level.

Article 12 imposes undergoing further medical examinations at appropriate intervals, and Article 13 imposes the employer shall take any necessary remedial action on the basis of the technical findings and the medical advice.

Ratifications
As of January 2023, the convention has been ratified by 50 states.

External links 
Text.
Ratifications.

Health treaties
Nuclear technology treaties
International Labour Organization conventions
Occupational safety and health treaties
Radiation
Treaties concluded in 1960
Treaties entered into force in 1962
Treaties of Argentina
Treaties of Azerbaijan
Treaties of Barbados
Treaties of the Byelorussian Soviet Socialist Republic
Treaties of Belgium
Treaties of the military dictatorship in Brazil
Treaties of Chile
Treaties of Czechoslovakia
Treaties of the Czech Republic
Treaties of Denmark
Treaties of Djibouti
Treaties of Ecuador
Treaties of Egypt
Treaties of Finland
Treaties of France
Treaties of West Germany
Treaties of Ghana
Treaties of Greece
Treaties of Guinea
Treaties of Guyana
Treaties of the Hungarian People's Republic
Treaties of India
Treaties of the Iraqi Republic (1958–1968)
Treaties of Italy
Treaties of Japan
Treaties of South Korea
Treaties of Kyrgyzstan
Treaties of Latvia
Treaties of Lebanon
Treaties of Lithuania
Treaties of Luxembourg
Treaties of Mexico
Treaties of the Netherlands
Treaties of Nicaragua
Treaties of Norway
Treaties of Paraguay
Treaties of the Polish People's Republic
Treaties of the Soviet Union
Treaties of Portugal
Treaties of Slovakia
Treaties of Francoist Spain
Treaties of Sri Lanka
Treaties of Sweden
Treaties of Switzerland
Treaties of Syria
Treaties of Tajikistan
Treaties of Turkey
Treaties of the Ukrainian Soviet Socialist Republic
Treaties of the United Kingdom
Treaties of Uruguay
1960 in labor relations

Radiation protection